Powers is a British television series first broadcast in 2004 on BBC One. The series was created by Jim Eldridge. It was promoted as a children's version of The X-Files, although many regarded it as a successor to The Tomorrow People. Powers ran for one 13-episode season, and was also broadcast in Australia. It has never been commercially released.

Overview
The series follows the adventures of The Powers Project, a group of researchers led by Professor Henry Powers (portrayed by Rupert Holliday-Evans), who investigate mysteries concerned with the paranormal. The other members of the project are Mark Roberts (Adam Jessop) and Song-Li Harris (Amy Yamazaki) (who joins the project at the end of episode 1), two teenagers with psychic abilities, and Dr Mary Holland (Mandana Jones), who used to have special powers but no longer does. Mark and Song-Li's powers are different: Mark is telepathic and can move objects with his mind; Song-Li can sense emotions and memories in objects.

Production and broadcast
Powers spent six years in development. During this time it was reported that Disney were interested in a possible co-production deal, but the show was instead produced only by the BBC.

The series was produced by Chris Le Grys, and episodes were directed by Emma Bodger and Brian Farnham; the three had previously worked on the ITV series Night and Day. Special effects and computer-generated imagery were created by Darkside Animation using LightWave 3D software. This consisted of 170 shots which were filmed between June and November 2003. Notable amongst these were the title sequence and end credits, and a UFO in episode 4, "We Are Not Alone".

The series was originally due to be broadcast by the BBC in autumn 2004, but was moved forward to begin on 7 January 2004. It was also shown on ABC in Australia.

Episodes

Critical response and legacy
Powers did receive some positive responses from viewers, although there was considerable variation between episodes. According to Simon Percy, the co-founder of Darkside Animation, the show's ratings were described as "excellent" by the BBC. For unknown reasons a second series was not produced, nor has the series been commercially released. The series was repeated a number of times on the digital CBBC Channel, but these repeats have now stopped.

References

External links

BBC children's television shows
British science fiction television shows
2000s British children's television series
2004 British television series debuts
2004 British television series endings
2000s British science fiction television series